The Green Truck of the Year is an award from the Green Car Journal. The winner is announced each fall at the San Antonio Auto & Truck Show in Texas. The award was introduced in 2015 to complement the current Green Car of the Year award.

Winners

2015 — RAM 1500 EcoDiesel
2016 — Ford F-150 
2017 — Honda Ridgeline
2018 — Chevy Colorado
2019 — Ram 1500

See also

 List of motor vehicle awards
 Green Car Vision Award
 Green vehicle
 PACE Award
 United States Environmental Protection Agency

References

External links
 Official website

Motor vehicle awards
Commercial vehicle awards
Trucks